Qovlar (also, Kovlar, Kovlyar, and Koylyar) is a village and the most populous municipality, except for the capital Tovuz, in the Tovuz Rayon of Azerbaijan.  It has a population of 13,642.

References

External Links 

Populated places in Tovuz District